Helen V. Milner (born 1958) is an American political scientist and the B. C. Forbes Professor of Public Affairs at the Woodrow Wilson School of Public and International Affairs at Princeton University, where she is also the Director of the Niehaus Center for Globalization and Governance. She has written extensively on issues related to international political economy like international trade, the connections between domestic politics and foreign policy, globalization and regionalism, and the relationship between democracy and trade policy.

Career 
She graduated with honors in international relations at Stanford University in 1980 and obtained her Ph.D in Political Science at Harvard University in 1986.

In Milner's 1988 book Resisting Protectionism, she seeks to explain why U.S. trade policy in the 1920s was more protectionist than in the 1970s, despite many similar underlying conditions. She argues that greater economic interdependence in the latter period created a coalition of actors who stood to gain from trade and thus lobbied against protectionism. The social science research design book Designing Social Inquiry by King, Keohane and Verba characterizes her study as a successful way that qualitative scholars can overcome omitted variable bias.

Since 1986 she was a professor at Columbia University and was between 2001 and 2004 James T. Shotwell Professor of International Relations at Columbia University. She moved to Princeton University in 2005, where she served as chair of the Politics department until 2011.

In 2021-2022, she served as president of the International Studies Association.

For the moment, she is conducting research on issues related to globalization and development, such as the political economy of foreign aid, the digital divide and the global diffusion of the internet, and the relationship between globalization and environmental policy.

Academic awards and honors 

Phi Beta Kappa, Stanford University, 1979.
Ray Atherton Fellowship in International Relations, Harvard University, 1980-1981 and 1981-1982.
Teaching Fellowship, Harvard University, 1982-1983.
Research Fellowship, Brookings Institution, Washington, D.C., 1983-1984.
Kennedy Traveling Fellowship, Harvard University, 1985, dissertation research in Paris at the Atlantic Institute for International Relations.
Sumner Prize, awarded by Harvard University for the exceptional thesis in international law and peace, June 1986.
Summer Fellowship, Columbia University Council for Research in the Humanities and Social Sciences, 1987 and 1988.
German Marshall Fund Fellowship, 1989-90 (declined).
Social Science Research Council Advanced Research Fellowship in Foreign Policy Studies, 1989-91.
Research grants, Institute for Social and Economic Policy Research, Columbia University, 1999-2002.
Member, Council on Foreign Relations, 2002–present.
Fellow, American Academy of Arts and Sciences, 2000–present.
Fellow, Center for Advanced Study in the Behavioral Sciences, Stanford CA., 2001–02.
 Fellow, Bellagio Study and Conference Center, Rockefeller Foundation, Bellagio, Italy, summer 2004.
 Member of the U.S. National Academy of Sciences, elected 2019

Bibliography

Books 
 
 
 
  General editor of multi-volume series.
 
 
 
 
  General editor of multi-volume series.

References

External links 
Princeton - Helen V. Milner
Princeton - Helen V. Milner - Curriculum Vitae

American women political scientists
American political scientists
International relations scholars
1958 births
Living people
Stanford University alumni
Harvard University alumni
Princeton University faculty
Columbia University faculty
Social Science Research Council
American women academics
International Political Science Association scholars
21st-century American women